Ronald Bolaños (born August 23, 1996) is a Cuban professional baseball pitcher in the Kansas City Royals organization.
He made his MLB debut with the San Diego Padres in 2019.

Career

San Diego Padres
Before coming to the United States, Bolaños played for Mayabeque of the Cuban National Series. He signed with the San Diego Padres as an international free agent on August 11, 2016.

Bolaños played for the Fort Wayne TinCaps in 2017, going 5–2 with a 4.42 ERA in 69 innings. He spent the 2018 season with the Lake Elsinore Storm, going 6–9 with a 5.11 ERA in 125 innings. Bolaños split the 2019 minor league season between Lake Elsinore and the Amarillo Sod Poodles, combining to go 13–7 with a 3.66 ERA over 129 innings.

The Padres selected Bolaños' contract and promoted him to the major leagues for the first time on September 2, 2019. He made his major league debut on September 3 versus the Arizona Diamondbacks, allowing two runs over six innings pitched.  Bolaños made three starts and two relief appearances for the Padres in 2019 and ended the season with a 5.95 ERA and 19 strikeouts in 19 innings.

Kansas City Royals
On July 16, 2020, Bolaños and Franchy Cordero were traded to the Kansas City Royals in exchange for Tim Hill. With the 2020 Kansas City Royals, Bolaños appeared in 2 games, compiling a 0–2 record with 12.27 ERA and 2 strikeouts in 3.2 innings pitched.

On June 18, 2021, Bolaños was placed on the 60-day injured list with a right forearm strain. Bolaños was activated from the injured list on September 12. He was designated for assignment on June 27, 2022.

References

External links

1996 births
Living people
People from Santa Cruz del Norte
People from Mayabeque Province
Cuban League players
Major League Baseball players from Cuba
Cuban expatriate baseball players in the United States
Major League Baseball pitchers
San Diego Padres players
Kansas City Royals players
Fort Wayne TinCaps players
Lake Elsinore Storm players
Amarillo Sod Poodles players
Omaha Storm Chasers players
Cuban expatriate baseball players in the Dominican Republic
Toros del Este players
2023 World Baseball Classic players